The 1920 United States presidential election in Louisiana took place on November 2, 1920 as part of the 1920 United States presidential election. Voters chose ten representatives, or electors to the Electoral College, who voted for president and vice president.

Background
Ever since the passage of a new constitution in 1898, Louisiana had been a one-party state dominated by the Democratic Party. The Republican Party became moribund due to the disenfranchisement of blacks and the complete absence of other support bases as the Pelican State completely lacked upland or German refugee whites opposed to secession. Despite this absolute single-party dominance, non-partisan tendencies remained strong among wealthy sugar planters in Acadiana and within the business elite of New Orleans.

Following disfranchisement, the state’s politics became dominated by the Choctaw Club of Louisiana, generally called the “Old Regulars”. This political machine was based in New Orleans and united with Black Belt cotton planters. Opposition began to emerge with the Progressive movement in the 1910s, chiefly in the southern sugar-growing parishes, where conflicts with President Wilson’s Underwoood-Simmons Act even allowed a Progressive Party member in Whitmell P. Martin to be elected to the Third Congressional District in 1914.

During the second term of President Wilson, the Acadian parishes became even more upset with him because of his deep disagreements with Georges Clemenceau, as well as continued problems with the issue of sugar tariffs. There was also strong opposition is this part of Louisiana to the Nineteenth Amendment, and also substantial opposition in the Black Belt of the state because it was believed that enfranchising women could interfere with lily-white politics. In the Ozark- and previously Socialist-influenced northern upcountry parishes, opposition to women’s suffrage was much weaker.

Vote
In Acadiana, the 1920 election would see a temporary break with “Solid South” voting patterns, as anger at the Wilson Administration’s foreign and domestic policies caused the region’s voters – much more moderate on racial issues than the rest of Louisiana – to break powerfully from Democratic nominee James M. Cox. Harding carried fourteen of the Acadian parishes, and in the two most sugar-dependent, Assumption and Lafourche, he received over three-quarters of the vote. In the remainder of Louisiana, as racially hardline as anywhere in the South, Democratic voting remained as rock-solid as ever despite nominee James M. Cox suffering a record 26.17 point landslide defeat and carrying only 41 counties outside antebellum slave states and Oklahoma. The revolt in Acadiana, however, was sufficient to drop Louisiana to Cox’ fourth-best state behind Georgia as well as South Carolina and Mississippi (as was typical in the “Solid South” era). As of the 2020 election, this is the last time that a Republican has won a majority in Iberville Parish and St. James Parish, as Dwight D. Eisenhower and Richard Nixon only received pluralities in these parishes.

Results

Results by parish

See also
 United States presidential elections in Louisiana

Notes

References

Louisiana
1920
1920 Louisiana elections